The Fédération wallonne de l'agriculture (Wallonian Agricultural Federation), abbreviated FWA, is the main professional association for the agricultural sector in Wallonia, one of the regions of Belgium. It was founded in 2001 by a merger of a number of different farmers' associations.

In September 2019, José Renard became director of the FWA.

References

External links
 Official website

Agricultural organisations based in Belgium
Farmers' organizations
Organizations established in 2001
2001 establishments in Belgium
Politics of Wallonia